Maurice Jean Marie Bourgès-Maunoury (19 August 1914 – 10 February 1993) was a French Radical politician who served as the Prime Minister in the Fourth Republic during 1957.

Bourgès-Maunoury was born in Luisant, Eure-et-Loir. He is famous, especially, for fulfilling a prominent ministerial role in the government during the Suez Crisis.

Prime minister

He became Prime Minister in June 1957.

While he was Prime Minister, the French Government achieved Parliamentary ratification of the Treaty of Rome.

He was succeeded as Prime Minister in November 1957 by Félix Gaillard.

Controversy

As minister of Interior, he nominated the controversial Maurice Papon at the head of the Prefecture of Police in 1958, functions which he kept during the 1961 Paris massacre.

Death

He died in Paris in 1993.

Bourgès-Maunoury's Ministry, 13 June – 6 November 1957
Maurice Bourgès-Maunoury – President of the Council
Christian Pineau – Minister of Foreign Affairs
André Morice – Minister of National Defense and Armed Forces
Jean Gilbert-Jules – Minister of the Interior
Félix Gaillard – Minister of Finance and Economic Affairs
Édouard Corniglion-Molinier – Minister of Justice
René Billères – Minister of National Education, Youth, and Sports
André Dulin – Minister of Veterans and War Victims
Gérard Jaquet – Minister of Overseas France
Édouard Bonnefous – Minister of Public Works, Transport, and Tourism
Albert Gazier – Minister of Social Affairs
Max Lejeune – Minister of Sahara
Félix Houphouët-Boigny – Minister of State

References

1914 births
1993 deaths
Politicians from Eure-et-Loir
Radical Party (France) politicians
Prime Ministers of France
École Polytechnique alumni
French people of the Algerian War
People of the Suez Crisis
Companions of the Liberation
Transport ministers of France
French Ministers of Commerce and Industry
French interior ministers
French Ministers of Finance